San Biagio della Cima is a comune (municipality) in the Province of Imperia in the Italian region Liguria, located about  southwest of Genoa and about  west of Imperia.  
 
San Biagio della Cima borders the following municipalities: Camporosso, Dolceacqua, Perinaldo, Soldano, Vallebona, and Vallecrosia.

History 
On 21 April 1686, the representants of eight villages, Camporosso, Vallebona, Vallecrosia, San Biagio della Cima, Sasso, Soldano, Borghetto San Nicolò and Bordighera had a meeting in order to build what they called "Magnifica Comunità degli Otto Luoghi", which can be translated as: "The magnificent community of the eight villages". Their goal was to gain independence from the nearby rival city of Ventimiglia.

Twin towns — sister cities
San Biagio della Cima is twinned with:

  Camps-la-Source, France (2005)

References

Cities and towns in Liguria